Halichondria papillaris is a species of sea sponge belonging to the family Halichondriidae.

References

Halichondrida
Animals described in 1766